Oxossia annularis is a shrub of Oxossia Turneroideae (Passifloraceae) native to eastern Brazil. O. annularis has 2–10 mm long petioles, rigid elliptical, ovate, or obovate leaves with serrated margins. 

It was previously classified as Turnera annularis, however, recent phylogenetic analysis supports its classification as Oxossia.

References 

Passifloraceae